The Iranian Plate is a small tectonic plate thought to underlie the Persian plateau, covering the modern-day countries of Iran and Afghanistan, and parts of Iraq and Pakistan. It is compressed between the Arabian Plate to the southwest, the Eurasian Plate to the north, and the Indian Plate to the southeast. This compression is likely a cause for the very mountainous terrain of the area including the Alborz and Zagros Mountains.

References
 William Bayne Fisher: The Middle East: a Physical, Social, and Regional Geography. Routledge 1978, p. 15–16

Tectonic plates
Geology of Afghanistan
Geology of Iran
Geology of Iraq
Geology of Pakistan